The 2006 Austin mayoral election was held on May 13, 2006 to elect the mayor of Austin, Texas. It saw the reelection of incumbent mayor Will Wynn.

Election results

References

2006 Texas elections
2006 United States mayoral elections
2006
Non-partisan elections